Pematangpayung is a village in the East Tanjung Jabung Regency in the Jambi Province of Sumatra, Indonesia.

Nearby towns and villages include Merlung (20.1 nm), Telukbengkah (17.7 nm), Pelabuhandagang (16.1 nm), Teluknilan (17.5 nm), Beramhitam-besar (15.3 nm), Pematanglumut (3.0 nm), Lubukrusa (28.0 nm) and Teluk (25.7 nm) .

References

External links
Satellite map at Maplandia.com

Populated places in Jambi